Cheltenham is a constituency
represented in the House of Commons of the UK Parliament. As with all constituencies, the constituency elects one Member of Parliament (MP) by the first past the post system of election at least every five years.

Boundaries and boundary changes

1885-1918: The existing parliamentary borough, and so much of the parish of Charlton Kings as lay to the north of the railway from Cheltenham to Banbury.

1918–1950: The Municipal Borough of Cheltenham and the Urban District of Charlton Kings.

1950–1983: As 1918 but with redrawn boundaries.

1983–1997: The Borough of Cheltenham, and the Borough of Tewkesbury wards of Leckhampton with Up Hatherley, Prestbury St Mary's, and Prestbury St Nicolas.

Leckhampton, Up Hatherley and Prestbury were added to the seat from the Cirencester and Tewkesbury constituency; they had previously been in the abolished Cheltenham Rural District.

1997–2010: The Borough of Cheltenham wards of All Saints, Charlton Kings, College, Hatherley and The Reddings, Hesters Way, Lansdown, Park, Pittville, St Mark's, St Paul's, and St Peter's.

Leckhampton, Up Hatherley and Prestbury were transferred to the new Tewkesbury constituency; they had been incorporated into the redrawn Borough of Cheltenham in 1991.

2010–present: The Borough of Cheltenham wards of All Saints, Battledown, Benhall and The Reddings, Charlton Kings, Charlton Park, College, Hesters Way, Lansdown, Leckhampton, Oakley, Park, Pittville, St Mark's, St Paul's, St Peter's, Springbank, Up Hatherley, and Warden Hill.

Leckhampton and Up Hatherley were transferred back to this seat from the Tewkesbury seat.

As its name suggests the constituency is based on the town of Cheltenham in Gloucestershire, covering a different, slightly smaller area than the borough of the same name. It is bordered by the Tewkesbury and Cotswolds seats.

Constituency profile
Famous for its racecourse which hosts the annual Cheltenham Gold Cup in March, with a long-established girls' school and right at the edge of the Cotswold Hills, Cheltenham has a large tourism sector. GE Aviation is a large employer and GCHQ, the government communications centre, is here, so numbers of highly skilled workers and professionals (47.5% in the year ended September 2014) are well above the national average (44.6%). One of the West of England's most upmarket towns, the few neighbourhoods of medium levels in the Index of Multiple Deprivation are almost wholly in Hester's Way ward which has the most social housing. About 10%  of the electorate are students at the University of Gloucestershire just outside the compact town centre. A Liberal Democrat served the seat from 1992 when their candidate Nigel Jones overturned four decades of Conservative MPs to 2015 when the Tories regained the seat.

History
Cheltenham borough constituency was created in the Great Reform Act of 1832 and has returned nine Liberals (or Liberal Democrats) and nine Conservatives to Parliament since that time, along with one independent.

A Conservative served the constituency from 1950 until 1992.  The Conservatives' campaign in the 1992 general election following the Poll Tax riots saw a local party member make racist remarks about their own candidate, John Taylor, who was of Afro-Caribbean descent. Taylor lost the election to Nigel Jones of the Liberal Democrats.

In 2000, Jones was nearly murdered in a horrific incident at one of his MP's surgeries; a man attacked him and an assistant with a samurai sword. His colleague Andrew Pennington was killed in the attack. Jones was made a life peer in 2005. The Liberal Democrats held Cheltenham in the 2005 election when Martin Horwood won the election, and again in 2010, but lost when the Conservatives retook the seat in 2015.

Members of Parliament

Elections

Elections in the 2020s

Elections in the 2010s 
In 2019, Cheltenham was one of five English constituencies, the others being Esher and Walton, Westmorland and Lonsdale, Winchester and East Devon, where Labour failed to obtain over 5% of the vote and lost their deposit.

Elections in the 2000s

Elections in the 1990s

Elections in the 1980s

Elections in the 1970s

Elections in the 1960s

Elections in the 1950s

Election in the 1940s

General Election 1939–40:

Another General Election was required to take place before the end of 1940. The political parties had been making preparations for an election to take place from 1939 and by the end of this year, the following candidates had been selected; 
Independent Conservative: Daniel Lipson
Conservative: C L Hargreaves
Labour: John Baird

Elections in the 1930s

Elections in the 1920s

Elections in the 1910s 

General Election 1914–15:

A general election was due to take place by the end of 1915. By the autumn of 1914, the following candidates had been adopted to contest that election. 
Unionist Party: James Agg-Gardner
Liberal Party: Rhys Williams
Due to the outbreak of war, the election never took place.

Elections in the 1900s

Elections in the 1890s

Elections in the 1880s

Election in the 1870s

Elections in the 1860s

Elections in the 1850s 

 Caused by Berkeley's appointment as a Commissioner of Customs.

Caused by Berkeley's death.

Elections in the 1840s 

Election declared void on petition due to "acts of corruption"

Election declared void on petition due to bribery

Elections in the 1830s

See also
 List of parliamentary constituencies in Gloucestershire

Notes

References

External links 
nomis Constituency Profile for Cheltenham – presenting data from the ONS annual population survey and other official statistics.

Parliamentary constituencies in South West England
Constituencies of the Parliament of the United Kingdom established in 1832
Politics of Cheltenham